Enargite is a copper arsenic sulfosalt mineral with formula Cu3AsS4. It takes its name from the Greek word , "distinct". Enargite is a steel gray, blackish gray, to violet black mineral with metallic luster. It forms slender orthorhombic prisms as well as massive aggregates. It has a hardness of 3 and a specific gravity of 4.45.

Enargite is dimorph of the tetragonal luzonite.

Occurrence
It is a medium to low temperature hydrothermal mineral occurring with quartz, pyrite, sphalerite, galena, bornite, tetrahedrite–tennantite, chalcocite, covellite and baryte. It occurs in the mineral deposits at Butte, Montana, San Juan Mountains, Colorado and at both Bingham Canyon and Tintic, Utah. It is also found in the copper mines of Canada, Mexico, Argentina, Chile, Peru, and the Philippines.

Enargite was originally described as a new species from the copper mines of the San Francisco vein, Junin Department, Peru. The name is from Greek  ("distinct"), in reference to its distinct cleavage.

Enargite is related to lazarevicite (named after M. Lazarevic), which has the same chemical formula, but cubic crystalline structure.

References

External links

Crystal structure of enargite

Copper minerals
Sulfosalt minerals
Orthorhombic minerals
Minerals in space group 31